Al-Tijara Sport Club (Trade SC) is an Iraqi football club based in Baghdad, that plays in Iraq Division Three.

History

In Premier League
Al-Tijara was founded in 1974 as Al-Iktisad as an amalgamation of Ministry of Trade teams, the most prominent of which were the Orosdi-Back team and the Al-Asha team. Al-Iktisad gained promotion to the Iraqi Premier League in 1975. The team played fifteen seasons in the Iraqi Premier League until 1992, first three seasons (1975–78) from those, played in their old name Al-Iktisad.

Suspension and resumption
In 2014, sports activities were suspended in the club, and after four years, in 2018, activities resumed and new teams were established in various sports, including the football team, which recently qualified to play in the Iraq Division Two.

Managerial history
 Ammo Baba
 Abdul Karim Jassim 
 Thiab Nuhair

Famous players
Mahdi Abdul-Sahib
Maad Ibrahim

See also 
 1990–91 Iraq FA Cup
 1991–92 Iraq FA Cup
 1992–93 Iraq FA Cup

References

External links
 Al-Tijara SC on Goalzz.com
 Iraq Clubs- Foundation Dates

Football clubs in Baghdad
1974 establishments in Iraq